Scincella is a genus of lizards in the skink family, Scincidae, commonly referred to as ground skinks. The exact number of species in the genus is unclear, as taxonomic reclassification is ongoing, and sources vary widely. Scincella species primarily range throughout the temperate regions of the world and are typically small, fossorial lizards, which consume a wide variety of arthropods. They are a generalized insectivore with well developed chemosensory abilities.

Species
The genus Scincella contains the following 38 recognized species:
Scincella apraefrontalis  - Huulien ground skink
Scincella assata  - red forest skink
Scincella badenensis  - Baden ground skink
Scincella baraensis 
Scincella barbouri (Stejneger, 1925) - Barbour's ground skink
Scincella boettgeri (Van Denburgh, 1912) - Boettger's ground skink 
Scincella capitanea Ouboter, 1986 - large ground skink
Scincella caudaequinae (H.M. Smith, 1951) - Horsetail Falls ground skink
Scincella cherriei  - brown forest skink
Scincella darevskii  - Darevsky's ground skink
Scincella devorator  
Scincella doriae (Boulenger, 1887) - Doria's ground skink, Doria's smooth skink
Scincella dunan Koizumi, Ota, & Hikida, 2022
Scincella forbesorum (Taylor, 1937)
Scincella formosensis (Van Denburgh, 1912) - Van Denburgh's ground skink
Scincella gemmingeri (Cope, 1864) - forest ground skink
Scincella huanrenensis Zhao & Huang, 1982
Scincella incerta 
Scincella kikaapoa 
Scincella lateralis (Say, 1823) - little brown skink, ground skink
Scincella macrotis (Steindachner, 1867) - large-eared ground skink
Scincella melanosticta (Boulenger, 1887) - black ground skink, black-spotted smooth skink
Scincella modesta (Günther, 1864) - modest ground skink
Scincella monticola (K.P. Schmidt, 1925) - mountainous dwarf skink  
Scincella nigrofasciata 
Scincella ochracea 
Scincella potanini 
Scincella przewalskii (Bedriaga, 1912)
Scincella punctatolineata (Boulenger, 1893) - Burma smooth skink
Scincella rara (Darevsky & Orlov, 1997) - double subdigital-pads skink
Scincella reevesii (Gray, 1838) - Reeves's smooth skink
Scincella rufocaudata  - red-tailed ground skink
Scincella rupicola 
Scincella schmidti 
Scincella silvicola (Taylor, 1937)
Scincella tsinlingensis (Hu & Zhao, 1966)
Scincella vandenburghi (K.P. Schmidt, 1927) - Korean skink, Tsushima ground skink, Tsushima smooth skink)
Scincella victoriana (Shreve, 1940)

Nota bene: A binomial authority in parentheses indicates that the species was originally described in a genus other than Scincella.

References

Further reading
Mittleman MB (1950). "The Generic Status of Scincus lateralis Say, 1823". Herpetologica 6 (2): 17–24. (Scincella, new genus).
Ouboter PE (1986). "A revision of the genus Scincella (Reptilia: Sauria: Scincidae) of Asia, with some notes on its evolution". Zoologische Verhandelingen 229: 1-66.

 
Reptiles of Asia
Reptiles of Central America
Reptiles of North America
Lizard genera
Taxa named by Myron Budd Mittleman

ko:도마뱀